Doppelgänger Paul, or A Film About How Much I Hate Myself is a Canadian comedy film, directed by Dylan Akio Smith and Kris Elgstrand and released in 2011.

The film stars Tygh Runyan as Karl, a lonely man who decides following a near-death experience that Paul (Brad Dryborough) is his doppelgänger, even though the two men look nothing alike. Although Paul agrees to edit Karl's unpublished manuscript A Book About How Much I Hate Myself, their burgeoning friendship is tested when he edits it in ways that Karl takes as an insult to his creativity; however, they must reunite to undertake a road trip to Portland, Oregon when the book is unexpectedly and inexplicably published several months later by a different pair of dissimilar doppelgängers whom neither man can recall having met.

The film's cast also includes Arabella Bushnell, Ben Cotton and Bronwen Smith.

The film premiered at the 2011 Toronto International Film Festival, before going into commercial release in 2012.

References

External links
 

2011 films
2011 comedy films
Canadian comedy road movies
English-language Canadian films
Films shot in British Columbia
2010s comedy road movies
2010s English-language films
Films directed by Dylan Akio Smith
2010s Canadian films